Sir Julian Day Rose, 5th and 4th Baronet (born March 1947) is a British aristocrat and exponent of organic farming. He changed the Hardwick Estate in South Oxfordshire to conform with the standards of organic farming in 1975. Rose succeeded to two baronetcies that were both under the name Rose.

Arms

References

External links
 Soilassociation.org
 Soilassociation.org
 Changingcourseforlife.info
 Cambridgeclarion.org
 Icppc.pl
 

1947 births
Living people
Baronets in the Baronetage of the United Kingdom
20th-century English farmers
21st-century English businesspeople
English agriculturalists
People from South Oxfordshire District
Canadian baronets
Organic farmers
Clan Rose